Félix Houphouët-Boigny was the first President of Côte d'Ivoire.

Houphouët-Boigny may also refer to:

 Denise Houphouët-Boigny, Ivorian academic and diplomat
 Marie-Thérèse Houphouët-Boigny, former First Lady of Côte d'Ivoire; current philanthropist
 Félix Houphouët-Boigny Peace Prize, established in 1990 as an award for individuals or institutions
 Coupe Houphouët-Boigny, a football competition in Côte d'Ivoire
 Stade Félix Houphouët-Boigny, a stadium in Abidjan, Côte d'Ivoire

See also